Oleksandra Nodariyivna Korashvili (born 1 March 1996) is a Ukrainian former tennis player.

In her career, Korashvili won three singles and 14 doubles titles on the ITF Women's Circuit. In July 2016, she reached her best singles ranking of world No. 414. On 13 July 2015, she peaked at No. 202 in the WTA doubles rankings.

Korashvili made her WTA Tour debut at the 2012 Baku Cup and ended runner-up at the 2013 Australian Open – Girls' doubles.

ITF Circuit finals

Singles: 7 (3 titles, 4 runner-ups)

Doubles: 28 (14 titles, 14 runner-ups)

Junior Grand Slam finals

Girls' doubles

External links
 
 

1996 births
Living people
Sportspeople from Odesa
Ukrainian female tennis players
Ukrainian people of Georgian descent